Remedie is the third album of the band Sorrowful Angels. It was recorded between May and July 2015. All music and lyrics are credited to Dion Christodoulatos.

Track listing

Credits

Sorrowful Angels
Dion Christodoulatos – vocals, lead guitar, music and lyrics
Nikolas Perlepe – rhythm guitar
Johny Litinakis – bass guitar
Stelios Pavlou – drums

Production
Dion Christodoulatos – production, mixing

Artwork
Themis "Fad" Ioannou – album artwork and photography

References

2015 albums
Sorrowful Angels albums